Gino Gard, born Gino Gardassanich; (November 26, 1922 – February 12, 2010) was a soccer goalkeeper who was a member of the United States team at the 1950 FIFA World Cup. He was born in Fiume, Free State of Fiume and died in Illinois, United States.

Club career
Gardassanich began his career with Fiumana and Reggina. After World War II, he played with NK Kvarner in the 1946–47 Yugoslav First League. In 1949, he moved to the United States, settling in Chicago. When he arrived, he changed his name to Gino Gard and joined Chicago Slovak of the National Soccer League of Chicago. He played with Slovak until 1959. During that time, Gard and his teammates won multiple titles, including the league title in 1951, 1952 and 1954; and the 1951 Peel Cup. In 1953, it lost the National Amateur Cup final to Ponta Delgada S.C. Gard was named the NSLC goalkeeper of the year in 1950.

National team
Gard was selected to the U.S. roster for the 1950 FIFA World Cup. He was the original choice as the starting goalkeeper, but never entered a game.

Gard was inducted into the Illinois Hall of Fame in 1992 and the National Soccer Hall of Fame in 2002.

Honors
Građanski Zagreb
 Independent State of Croatia Championship: 1941

Chicago Slovak
National Soccer League of Chicago: 1951, 1952, 1954

Individual
NSLC Goalkeeper of the Year: 1950
National Soccer Hall of Fame
Illinois Hall of Fame

References

External links
 National Soccer Hall of Fame profile
 FIFA player stats
 Gino Gardassanich website

1922 births
2010 deaths
American soccer players
Chicago Slovak players
U.S. Fiumana players
HŠK Građanski Zagreb players
Italian emigrants to the United States
National Soccer Hall of Fame members
National Soccer League (Chicago) players
Reggina 1914 players
People from Rijeka
Footballers from Rijeka
HNK Orijent players
HNK Rijeka players
1950 FIFA World Cup players
Association football goalkeepers